Major Sir Lancelot Ernest Curran (8 March 1899 – 20 October 1984) was a Northern Ireland High Court judge and parliamentarian.

He was elected as Ulster Unionist Member of Parliament for Carrick in the Stormont Parliament serving from 1945–49, and was Parliamentary Secretary to the Minister of Finance (Chief Whip) (17 July 1945 - 12 June 1947).

Curran was Attorney General for Northern Ireland (6 June 1947 – 4 November 1949), the youngest in the history of that parliament. He was a member of the Orange Order and became a member of the Privy Council of Northern Ireland.

Murder of Patricia Curran
Lancelot and Doris Curran had three children: Michael, Patricia and Desmond. Desmond became a barrister and latterly a Roman Catholic convert and missionary in South Africa. 

On 12 November 1952 Patricia, aged 19, and a student at Queen's University, Belfast, was murdered. Her body was found in the driveway of the Curran home, Glen House, Whiteabbey, County Antrim. She had been stabbed thirty-seven times.

A 20 year old RAF technician, Iain Hay Gordon, who had met Patricia at the Presbyterian church they both attended, was convicted of her murder. His sentence was overturned in 2000 after the Northern Ireland Court of Appeal found it to be unsafe.

Scapegoat, a BBC Northern Ireland drama about the conviction of Hay Gordon, was broadcast in 2009.

Famous Trials
Curran presided over the trial of Robert McGladdery for the murder of 19-year-old Pearl Gamble, near Newry, in 1961. McGladdery protested his innocence but was found guilty and hanged at Crumlin Road jail in Belfast on 20 December 1961; it was the last hanging in Northern Ireland.

A fictionalized account of the trial and execution of McGladdery, Orchid Blue, was written by Eoin McNamee and published in 2010 (McNamee had previously written a Booker Prize-nominated novel, Blue Tango, about the murder of Patricia Curran). 

Another McNamee novel, Blue Is The Night (published in 2014), deals with Curran's involvement in a murder trial in the Northern Ireland of the late 1940s.

Later years and death
Sir Lancelot's first wife, Lady Doris Curran, died on 29 May 1975. He remarried, to Margaret Pearce a year later. He died in Sussex in 1984.

References

1899 births
1984 deaths
Attorneys General for Northern Ireland
British Army General List officers
British Army personnel of World War II
High Court judges of Northern Ireland
Lords Justice of Appeal of Northern Ireland
Members of the House of Commons of Northern Ireland 1938–1945
Members of the House of Commons of Northern Ireland 1945–1949
Members of the House of Commons of Northern Ireland 1949–1953
Members of the Privy Council of Northern Ireland
Northern Ireland junior government ministers (Parliament of Northern Ireland)
Ulster Unionist Party members of the House of Commons of Northern Ireland
Members of the House of Commons of Northern Ireland for County Antrim constituencies